Serkan Özdemir (born May 14, 1976 in İstanbul, Turkey), is a former Turkish football player.

External links
  Profile at TFF.org 
 Profile at futbolig.com.tr 

1976 births
Living people
Turkish footballers
Eskişehirspor footballers
Çaykur Rizespor footballers
Samsunspor footballers
Diyarbakırspor footballers
Sarıyer S.K. footballers
Footballers from Istanbul
Association football midfielders